is a professional Japanese baseball player. He plays catcher for the Fukuoka SoftBank Hawks.

External links

 NPB.com

1986 births
Living people
Baseball people from Kagoshima Prefecture
Waseda University alumni
Japanese baseball players
Nippon Professional Baseball catchers
Yokohama BayStars players
Yokohama DeNA BayStars players
Fukuoka SoftBank Hawks players
Baseball players at the 2018 Asian Games
Asian Games silver medalists for Japan
Medalists at the 2018 Asian Games
Asian Games medalists in baseball